From tha Roota to tha Toota is the second album from the hip hop duo Field Mob released under the now defunct recording label MCA Records, currently distributed by Geffen Records. It was released to stores on October 22, 2002. The title of the album is a colloquial southern United States reference to making use of an entire pig - from the snout to the tail. The LP spawned the Jazze Pha produced single "Sick of Being Lonely" which reached #18 on the US Billboard Hot 100 and #5 on the US Billboard Hot Rap Tracks charts in 2002. This album reached #33 on the US Billboard Top 200 and #4 on the US Top R&B/Hip Hop Albums charts. It has since been certified gold, selling over 700,000 copies.

Track listing 
 K.A.N. - 4:12
 Nothing 2 Lose (featuring Sleepy Brown & Slimm Calhoun) - 5:44
 Don't Want No Problems - 4:53
 Bitter Broads (Interlude) - 1:51
 Sick of Being Lonely (featuring Torica) - 3:49
 Where R U Going? (featuring Joi) - 4:14
 It's Hell (featuring Ole-E) - 4:51
 ConverHation (skit) - 3:09
 Haters (featuring Trick Daddy) - 4:03
 Hit It for Free (featuring Kokane) - 4:59
 Kuntry Cooking (skit) - 1:38
 Betty Rocker - 3:34
 Cut Loose - 4:57
 All I Know (featuring CeeLo Green & Greg Street) - 3:54
 Sick of Being Lonely (Dirty South Remix) (featuring Torica & Trina) - 3:46

Charts

Weekly charts

Year-end charts

References 

2002 albums
Field Mob albums
MCA Records albums
Albums produced by Jazze Pha